The Empire of the Steppes: A History of Central Asia is a 1939 book written by French historian René Grousset covering the history of Central Asia from ancient times through 1757. The book covers a long arc of history, from the nomadic travels of the ancient Scythians to the final empires of the Mongols in the 18th century. The work was translated into English in 1952 by Naomi Walford and republished in 1970 by Rutgers University Press. Designed for both the lay reader searching for an introduction to the subject, as well as historians of the subject, the book covers a sweep of history covering ten centuries and centers around the careers of three major historical figures in Central Asian history, Attila the Hun, Genghis Khan, and Timur.

Academic journal reviews

About the author

See also
 Eurasian Steppe
 History of Central Asia

Notes

References 
 Citations

External links 
 Abazov, R. (2008). Palgrave Concise Historical Atlas of Central Asia. Palgrave Macmillan.
 Bregel, Y. (2003). An Historical Atlas of Central Asia (Illustrated edition). Brill.

Books about Central Asia
1939 non-fiction books
1970 non-fiction books